The 3,7 cm KPÚV vz. 37 was an anti-tank gun produced by the Škoda Works that saw service in World War II. Originally designed for the Czechoslovak Army, some were also sold to Yugoslavia. A number were appropriated by the Germans after the German occupation of Czechoslovakia in 1939 and used under the designations 3,7 cm PaK 37 (t). Captured Yugoslav guns were used under the designation of 3,7 cm Pak 156 (j). Slovakia acquired 158 when it declared independence from Czechoslovakia in March 1939.

The gun had a small shield and wooden-spoked wheels, although some were fitted with pneumatic wheels.

Notes

References
 Gander, Terry and Chamberlain, Peter. Weapons of the Third Reich: An Encyclopedic Survey of All Small Arms, Artillery and Special Weapons of the German Land Forces 1939-1945. New York: Doubleday, 1979 
 

World War II anti-tank guns
37 mm artillery
Artillery of Czechoslovakia
Military equipment introduced in the 1930s